Musa: Ancestral Streams is a solo piano album by Stanley Cowell recorded in 1973 and first released on the Strata-East label.

Reception

In his review for AllMusic, Jason Ankeny states "Musa Ancestral Streams remains a relative oddity in the pantheon of jazz's black consciousness movement -- a solo piano set of stunning reach and scope, its adherence to intimacy contrasts sharply with the bold, multi-dimensional sensibilities that signify the vast majority of post-Coltrane excursions into spiritual expression, yet the sheer soulfulness and abandon of Stanley Cowell's performance nevertheless vaults the record into the same physical and metaphysical planes".

Track listing
All compositions by Stanley Cowell
 "Abscretions" 5:10
 "Equipoise" - 3:44
 "Prayer for Peace" - 7:07
 "Emil Danenberg" - 2:45
 "Maimoun" - 6:30
 "Travelin' Man" - 2:56
 "Departure No. 1" - 5:25
 "Departure No. 2" - 2:15
 "Sweet Song" - 3:05

Personnel
Stanley Cowell - piano, electric piano, kalimba

References

1974 albums
Stanley Cowell albums
Strata-East Records albums